Anthaxia caseyi is a species of metallic wood-boring beetle in the family Buprestidae. It is found in North America.

Subspecies
These four subspecies belong to the species Anthaxia caseyi:
 Anthaxia caseyi caseyi Obenberger, 1914
 Anthaxia caseyi pseudotsugae Chamberlin, 1928
 Anthaxia caseyi santarosae Cobos, 1958
 Anthaxia caseyi sublaevis Van Dyke, 1916

References

Further reading

 
 
 

Buprestidae
Articles created by Qbugbot
Beetles described in 1914